Elections to the Assembly of Representatives of Mandatory Palestine were held on 2 August 1944. Just over 200,000 Jewish residents voted, more than 70% of all those eligible to vote. This compared with just over 50,000 who voted at the previous elections in 1931. The difference reflected the high level of Jewish immigration to Palestine in the 1930s and 1940s.

Campaign
A total of 24 parties contested the elections, nominating 1,694 candidates. However, the Revisionist-Zionist Hatzohar party, Sephardic Jews, the General Zionist Group “B” and the Jewish Farmers Association boycotted the elections.

Results

Around 80% of the elected Assembly members supported the Biltmore Declaration, which demanded the creation of a "Jewish Commonwealth" after World War II.

References

Palestine
Elections in Israel
1944 in Mandatory Palestine
August 1944 events
Palestine